The 2001 CAF Champions League Final was the final of the 2001 CAF Champions League.

It was a football tie held over two legs in December 2001 between Al-Ahly  of Egypt, and  Mamelodi Sundowns of South Africa.

Al-Ahly won the final with aggregate 4-1, first leg 1-1 and second 3-0

Qualified teams
In the following table, finals until 1996 were in the African Cup of Champions Club era, since 1997 were in the CAF Champions League era.

Venues

Loftus Versfeld Stadium

Loftus Versfeld Stadium is a rugby and football stadium situated in the Arcadia suburb of Pretoria, Gauteng, South Africa. The stadium has a capacity of 51,762 for rugby union and it is occasionally used for football matches.

The stadium was named after Robert Loftus Owen Versfeld, the founder of organized sports in Pretoria. Through the years the stadium has undergone various name changes as sponsors came and went, though locals have always referred to the stadium as Loftus Versfeld.

The stadium is the home ground of the Bulls franchise of the Super Rugby tournament and the Blue Bulls union in South Africa's Currie Cup.  Also home ground for the South African  premier soccer league  champions Mamelodi  Sundowns 
 
Also, the South Africa national rugby union team has played several test matches at the Loftus Versfeld Stadium. They played New Zealand in 1970, 1996, and 1999, Australia in 1967, 1997, 2001, England in 1994 and 2000, and Ireland in 1998.

Cairo International Stadium

Cairo International Stadium, formerly known as Nasser Stadium, is an Olympic-standard, multi-use stadium with an all-seated capacity of 75,000. The architect of the stadium is the German Werner March, who had built from 1934 to 1936 the Olympic Stadium in Berlin. Before becoming an all seater stadium, it had the ability to hold over 100,000 spectators, reaching a record of 120,000. It is the foremost Olympic-standard facility befitting the role of Cairo, Egypt as the center of events in the region. It is also the 69th largest stadium in the world. Located in Nasr City; a suburb north east of Cairo, it was completed in 1960, and was inaugurated by President Gamal Abd El Nasser on 23 July that year, the eighth anniversary of the Egyptian Revolution of 1952. Zamalek SC currently use the Petro Sport Stadium for most of their home games and Al Ahly use Al Salam Stadium for most of their home games.

Road to final

Format
The final was decided over two legs, with aggregate goals used to determine the winner. If the sides were level on aggregate after the second leg, the away goals rule would have been applied, and if still level, the tie would have proceeded directly to a penalty shootout (no extra time is played).

Matches

First leg

Second leg

Notes and references

External links
2001 CAF Champions League - cafonline.com

Final
2001
1
December 2001 sports events in Africa
Mamelodi Sundowns F.C. matches
Al Ahly SC matches